The Hautapu River is a river in the Hawkes Bay region of New Zealand. Its catchment is almost entirely forested.

The Hautapu rises near the source of the Waìpunga River in pumice country, near the eastern edge of the Volcanic Plateau, where large Manoao flats have been converted into pine forest. It winds south-east through a steep, eroding greywacke gorge with podocarp forest. In the lower gorge several Hautapu tributaries drain unmodified beech and mixed podocarp forest. The river leaves the gorge at Ngatapa, once an important Ngāti Hineuru pā, and flows for over a kilometre through pasture and pine forest to join Te Hoe River.

The river is part of the system protected by the Water Conservation (Mohaka River) Order of 15 November 2004 for its high ecological, cultural, recreational and scenic significance.

References 

Rivers of the Hawke's Bay Region
Rivers of New Zealand